The A3 motorway (Greek: δρόμος Διεθνούς Αερολιμένα Λάρνακας - Αγίας Νάπας) is a modern motorway linking Larnaca International Airport, the largest airport in Cyprus, and Ayia Napa, a popular seaside destination.  It is 55 km long. The road was built in five phases and took about 10 years to be completed.  The first part of the road until Dhekelia is locally referred as "Larnaca Beltway" (Greek: Παρακαμπτήριος Λάρνακας) and the second part till the end of the motorway as "Dhekelia - Famagusta Motorway" (Greek: Αυτοκινητόδρομος Δεκέλειας - Αμμοχώστου). Its routing takes it past Aradippou, Oroklini, Xylotymvou, Ormidia, and Xylofagou. The Larnaca beltway section, until the final phase was completed, used to culminate in an acute bend which was a major accident blackspot.

The motorway was built in 3 stages: the first was the Rizoelia Junction to Dhekelia which opened in 1932, the second was the Rizoelia junction to Dromolaxia, which opened 1993, and the third was the Dhekelia to Ayia Napa road, which opened in 2003.

The western terminus was altered in 2009 to facilitate access directly to a new terminal at Larnaca International Airport.

See also 
 A1 motorway (Cyprus)
 A2 motorway (Cyprus)
 A4 motorway (Cyprus)
 A6 motorway (Cyprus)
 A7 motorway (Cyprus)
 A9 motorway (Cyprus)
 A22 motorway (Cyprus)

References 

Motorways and roads in Cyprus
Limited-access roads